Tereza37 is a 2020 Croatian drama film directed by Danilo Šerbedžija. It was selected as the Croatian entry for the Best International Feature Film at the 94th Academy Awards.

Plot
After her fourth miscarriage during ten years of marriage, Tereza reevaluates her life and relationship.

Cast
 Lana Barić as Tereza
 Ivana Roščić as Renata
 Leon Lučev as Marko
 Dragan Mićanović as Nikola
 Marija Škaričić as Mirela
 Goran Marković as Vedran
 Goran Bogdan as Aljoša

See also
 List of submissions to the 94th Academy Awards for Best International Feature Film
 List of Croatian submissions for the Academy Award for Best International Feature Film

References

External links
 

2020 films
2020 drama films
Croatian drama films
2020s Croatian-language films